The New York Rangers are a professional ice hockey team based in Manhattan, New York. They are members of the Metropolitan Division of the Eastern Conference of the National Hockey League (NHL). Playing their home games at Madison Square Garden, the Rangers are one of the oldest teams in the NHL, having joined in 1926 as an expansion franchise, and are part of the group of teams referred to as the Original Six. The Rangers were the first NHL franchise in the United States to win the Stanley Cup, which they have done four times (most recently in 1994). The team is commonly referred to by its famous nickname, "The Broadway Blueshirts", or more commonly in New York media, as simply the "Blueshirts".

There have been thirty-five head coaches for the Rangers, the first one being Lester Patrick, and the most recent being David Quinn. Muzz Patrick, Alfred Pike, Ron Smith, and Colin Campbell are the only coaches who spent their entire careers with the Rangers and were not elected to the Hockey Hall of Fame. Bernie Geoffrion, Lynn Patrick, Emile Francis, Glen Sather, Craig Patrick, Roger Neilson, Herb Brooks, and Fred Shero have all been inducted to the Hockey Hall of Fame. Lester Patrick, Frank Boucher, Neil Colville, Bill Cook, Phil Esposito, Doug Harvey, and Bryan Trottier have all coached the Rangers for their entire coaching careers and have been elected to the Hockey Hall of Fame. Emile Francis has coached the most regular season games, 654, and the most playoff games, 75, in franchise history. Emile Francis also holds the franchise records in regular season wins, 342, and playoff wins, 34. Mike Keenan, the twenty-fifth head coach of the Rangers, amassed the best points percentage, .667, and regular season winning percentage, .619, having done so in a single, 84-game season. Keenan is also the only head coach to have coached the Rangers to a Presidents' Trophy and Stanley Cup in the same season. Lester Patrick is the only head coach to have coached the Rangers to multiple Stanley Cups. Under head coach Alain Vigneault the Rangers set franchise records in wins (53) and points (113) in a single season, having set both records in the 2014–15 season. The Jack Adams Award has never been awarded to the head coach of the New York Rangers.

Key

Coaches
Note: Statistics are correct through the 2021–22 season.

See also
List of NHL head coaches

Notes
 A running total of the number of coaches of the New York Rangers. Thus any coach who has two or more separate terms as head coach is only counted once.

References

 
New York Rangers head coaches
Head coaches